The Pakistani prisoners of war during the Indo-Pakistani War of 1971 were the servicemen deployed in the Eastern Command of the Pakistan armed forces who were held in by the Indian Army.

Pakistan's Yahya administration conveyed their intentions to retreat from their eastern wing to the United Nations on 10 December 1971, and a formal surrender was submitted and accepted when the Commander of Eastern Command and Governor of East Pakistan, Lieutenant-General A.A.K. Niazi, signed an instrument of surrender with his counterpart, Lieutenant General Jagjit Singh Aurora, GOC-in-C of Eastern Command, on 16 December 1971.

The surrender ultimately culminated in the conclusion of liberation efforts in East as India accepts the unilateral ceasefire to end its war efforts in the western theatre on 17 December 1971. The surrender was the largest surrender that the World had witnessed since the end of World War II, with Indian Army taking approximately 93,000–95,000 Pakistani service personnel as war prisoners in East.

Due to the concern of their safety and wellbeing, the war prisoners were transported via train and air, where they were held in the war camps by the Indian Army in different parts of India. The issue of transfer and transportation of war prisoners to India was very controversial between the India and Bangladesh since the Provisional Government of Bangladesh had shown strong resistance and opposition of such act to India as they wanted to bring charges on the war prisoners on the crimes against humanity in their special courts established in Dhaka.

The overwhelming majority of war prisoners were officers, most of them were in the Army and Navy, while relatively small number of Air Force and Marines; others in larger number had served in paramilitary forces. India treated the war prisoners in accordance to the Geneva Convention, ruled 1925, but used this issue as a tool to coerce Pakistan into recognizing the sovereignty of Bangladesh after three countries reached compromised in 1974. The issue of war prisoners contributed in quick recognition of Bangladesh but it also had effects on India securing its eastern front from Pakistan-controlled hostile state, East-Pakistan, to India supported Bangladesh.

According to Pakistani observers and commentators, India, by taking and managing the ~97,000 war prisoners in Indian Army-ran camps, had gained itself a bargaining chip to remove its security threat faced by its eastern front by recognizing the sovereignty of the country, Bangladesh, they had intervened to help. However, according to Indian author, M. Ragostra, the war prisoners were actually more of liability than leverage since it became India's responsibility to protect and feed the prisoners that were in great numbers.

Custody and detainment

After conceding defeat and accession of the instrument of surrender in 1971, the Indian Army took the responsibility to protect the Pakistan's joint servicemen in East-Pakistan. During the early phases of the surrender, Lieutenant-General Jagjit Singh Aurora allowed the Pakistani servicemen their right to bear small arms for their protection against the insurgents of Mukti Bahini who were seeking their revenge on Pakistani servicemen.

In December 1971, the Provisional Government of Bangladesh had shown their intention to India regarding the war prisoners, creating controversy between the India and Bangladesh, as Bangladeshis wanting to hold the cases on the Pakistani servicemen who would be charge with the crimes against humanity in their special courts, and strongly opposed the Indian Army's plan for transferring of war prisoners. From 1971 till 1972, the Indian Army quickly transferred the war prisoners to their special war camps in different parts of India through train and air transportation, mainly due to prisoners safety and wellbeing.

The military commanders of Eastern Command of Pakistani military were held in Fort William in Calcutta, and were transferred by the Air India's commercial plane. Later, the commanders were held in Jabalpur Cantonment. In 1973, majority of the war prisoners were then shifted to Red Fort and Gwalior Fort in New Delhi.

The Indian government treated all the war prisoners in strict accordance with the Geneva Convention, ruled in 1925. These 93,000 war prisoners were slowly released by India who were repatriated at the Zero Point, Wagah, and the Line of Control (LoC). India took approximately 93,000 prisoners of war that included Pakistani soldiers as well as some of their East Pakistani collaborators. 79,676 of these prisoners were uniformed personnel, of which 55,692 were Army, 16,354 Paramilitary, 5,296 Police, 1000 Navy and 800 PAF. The remaining 13,324 prisoners were civilians - either family members of the military personnel or Bihari Razarkars.

Before the war prisoners were repatriated, Pakistan and India had to sign the Simla Agreement in 1972 but it was not until 1974 when the Delhi Agreement was signed that marked the repatriation. The Simla Agreement treaty ensured that Pakistan recognized the independence of Bangladesh in exchange for the return of the Pakistani POWs.

Notable Pakistani POWs
Lt-Gen. Amir Abdullah Khan Niazi, PA, Commander of Eastern Command.
R.-Adm Mohammad Shariff, PN, later four-star admiral and Chairman joint chiefs in 1980.
Maj-Gen. Rao Farman Ali, military adviser and chairman of Fauji Foundation in the 1970s.
Air-Cdre Inamul Haque, PAF pilot, later three-star rank air force general and politician
Maj-Gen. Mohammad Jamshed, PA
Capt. Ahmad Zamir, CO PM in East, later appointed as Vice-Admiral in the Navy.
Gp-Capt. Zulfiqar Ali Khan, PAF pilot and later four-star rank air force general.
Lt-Cdr. Mansurul Haq, PN, four-star admiral in the Navy.
 Flt-Lt. PQ Mehdi– the PAF pilot who shot down, first POW, ascended as four-star rank air force general, Air Chief Marshal, and chief of air staff in 2000.
 Lt. Shahid Karimullah, PN, four-star admiral in the Pakistan Navy in 2005.
 Maj. K.M. Arif, PA, four-star rank army general and vice-chief of army staff 1987.
 Cdr. T.K. Khan, PN, four-star admiral in 1983.
Maj. Siddique Salik, PA, later one-star rank army general and DG of Inter-Services Public Relations in 1988
Capt. Ikram Sehgal, first to escape the prison camp.
Lt-Col. Raja Nadir Pervez, PM, politician.
Cdr. Iqbal F. Quadir, PN, analyst and later ascended as vice-admiral and vice naval chief in 1983.
Lt. Abdul Aziz Mirza, PN, later ascended as four-star admiral in 2002.
Capt. Jamshed Gulzar Kiani, PA later ascended as three-star rank army general.
Lt. T.M. Khattak, PN, three-star rank admiral in the Navy
Lt-Cdr Shamoon Alam Khan, PN and ISI agent, diplomat and later three-star rank admiral in the Navy.

Foreign relations impact
The foreign reaction to India's taking of these 90,000 POWs varied from nation to nation. The United Nations supported India's move as they condemned the human rights violations the Pakistani Armed Forces inflicted upon Bangladeshis. As a result, the U.N. was quick to accept Bangladesh's independence. Bhutan became the second country after India to recognize Bangladesh's independence and did so with no issues. The United States however, was an ally of Pakistan both materially and politically, and as a result they did not support India's taking of 90,000 Pakistani POWs. The U.S. saw India's actions as threatening especially since India had just become a nuclear power and maintained close military ties with the U.S.S.R. The Soviet Union supported both the armies of Bangladesh and India and thus supported Bangladesh's unwaveringly. As a result of Soviet support, all nations that were part of the Warsaw Pact also recognized Bangladesh's independence. Soviet backing ensured that the states in the U.S.S.R.'s sphere of influence, including Albania, Bulgaria, Czechoslovak Socialist Republic, East Germany, Hungary, Poland, and Romania all recognized Bangladesh's independence. China, despite being a communist nation, was also an ally of Pakistan and did not support the measures India took to have Bangladeshi sovereignty recognized. China even went as far as vetoing Bangladesh's application to become a member of the United Nations and was one of the last nations in the world to recognize Bangladeshi independence, not doing so until 31 August 1975.

See also
 Missing 54
 Prisoner of war
 1971
 Prisoner-of-war camp
 Indo-Pakistani War of 1971
 Timeline of the Bangladesh Liberation War
 Military plans of the Bangladesh Liberation War
 Mitro Bahini order of battle
 Pakistan Army order of battle, December 1971
 Evolution of Pakistan Eastern Command plan
 1971 Bangladesh genocide
 Operation Searchlight
 Indo-Pakistani wars and conflicts
 Military history of India
 List of military disasters
 List of wars involving India

References

Prisoners of war by conflict
Indo-Pakistani War of 1971
India–Pakistan relations
War crimes in Bangladesh
Bangladesh Liberation War
Bangladesh–Pakistan relations
Pakistani prisoners of war
Bangladesh–India relations
History of the Indian Army